Epipactis gigantea is a species of orchid known as the stream orchid, giant helleborine, and chatterbox. This wildflower is native to western North America from British Columbia to central Mexico. This is one of the most abundant orchids of the Pacific coast of North America.

Description 
Epipactis gigantea is an erect perennial reaching anywhere from 30 centimeters to one meter in height. Its stems have prominently-veined, wide or narrow lance-shaped leaves 5 to 15 centimeters long and inflorescences of two or three showy orchids near the top. Each flower has three straight sepals which are light brownish or greenish with darker veining, each one to two centimeters long. The two top petals are similar in shape and reddish-brown with purple veins. The lowest petal is cup-shaped with a pointed, tongue-like protuberance and is brighter red-brown and more starkly veined, often with areas of yellow. The fruit is a hanging capsule 2 or 3 centimeters long which contains thousands of tiny seeds. This plant grows in wet areas in a variety of habitats, including riverbanks, hot springs, and meadows at elevations between 2800 and 8000 feet. Unlike some of its relatives, this species is an autotroph. A distinctive race with burgundy colored foliage is known from The Cedars in Sonoma County California, an area of serpentine rock, and it is called forma rubrifolia (P M Brown).

Cultivation 
Epipactis gigantea is cultivated in the specialty horticulture trade and available as a non-wild collected propagated ornamental plant. A maroon-leaved (forma rubrifolia) cultivar is also grown, called 'Serpentine Night'.

References 

 C.Michael Hogan, ed. 2010.  Epipactis gigantea - Encyclopedia of Life
Jepson Manual Treatment - Epipactis gigantea

External links 
Las Pilitas Nursery, Epipactis gigantea, Stream Orchid and Giant helleborine
Ecology: Epipactis gigantea
Epipactis gigantea - Photo gallery
Washington Native Orchid Society, Epipactis gigantea or Stream Orchid
Colorado State University, Epipactis gigantea Dougl. ex Hook. (stream orchid): A Technical Conservation Assessment
Lady Bird Johnson Wildflower Center, University of Texas @ Austin, Epipactis gigantea 
Rare Plants United Kingdom, Epipactis gigantea
Dave's Garden, PlantFiles: Species Orchid, Giant Helleborine, Giant Stream Orchid, Epipactis, Epipactis gigantea  
Southwestern Colorado Wildflowers, Epipactis gigantea 
E-flora BC: Electronic Atlas of the Flora of British Columbia

gigantea
Orchids of Canada
Orchids of Mexico
Orchids of the United States
Flora of the Western United States
Flora of Western Canada
Flora of Northwestern Mexico
Flora of the Sierra Nevada (United States)
Flora of California
Flora of the California desert regions
Garden plants of North America
Plants described in 1839
Flora without expected TNC conservation status